The Latvian Institute of International Affairs is a think tank in Latvia. Founded on May 20, 1992, the organization seeks to provide “Latvia's decision-makers, experts, and the wider public with analysis, recommendations, and information about international developments, regional security issues, and foreign policy strategy and choices”. They achieve this by publishing original research, hosting conferences, and partnering with other institutions in these tasks. Their research focuses on important topics such as Latvian foreign policy; transatlantic relations; European Union policies, including its neighborhood policy and Eastern Partnership; and multilateral and bilateral relations with Russia. The LIIA is a nonprofit and does not receive regular government funding. Its funding primarily comes from its partners for individual projects. While the LIIA is a non-governmental organization, they do advise the Latvian Parliament, as well as other decision-making bodies within and outside of Latvia. The current director (2011) of LIIA is Andris Sprūds.

History

Fellows 
The Latvian Institute of International Affairs was founded in 1992 by founder/former director Atis Lejiņš (1992-2011). Dr Andris Sprūds became director of the Latvian think thank in 2011, whilst Karlis Bukovskis is the current Deputy Director. The LIIA consists of 10 or more research fellows with expertise in varying fields such as; foreign policy and security issues, the dynamics of the European Union and EU external relations, transcontinental interconnectivity initiatives, including those of the New Silk Road. and Latvia's membership in the EU. There are also a number of associate research fellows at the institute.

Conferences and Publications 
The Latvian Institute of International Affairs focuses its efforts on publishing and presenting research, often in coordination with its partners. These events include the annual presentation and publication of the Latvian Foreign and Security Policy Yearbook, launches for other books and collaborations with various embassies in Latvia, and the annual Riga Dialogue Afterthoughts conference. Frequent topics explored in these dialogues include the future of the EU, the future of NATO, and relations with Russia. Such gatherings provide opportunities for prominent political figures and thinkers in Europe to discuss current events and to foster cooperation with one another.

New Silk Road Programme 
One such effort is the New Silk Road Programme, launched in July 2017, it is led by Una Aleksandra Bērziņa-Čerenkova, Head of the New Silk Road programme.  

In the context of the development of the New Silk Road interconnectivity initiatives, the LIIA New Silk Road Programme aims to:

 promote and coordinate research activities involving countries and regions in Europe and Asia integrated into the initiatives along the New Silk Road
conceptualise and assess the involvement of Latvia into the transportation, logistics, information, financial, digital and human capital exchange connected to China's Belt and Road Initiative
 provide expertise on China's initiatives involving the Baltic region, including the China-CEEC "16+1" cooperation mechanisms
 represent Latvia at think tank networks and participate in research activities related to the assessment of the developments along the New Silk Road
 assess the prospects and strategies of India, Iran, Middle Eastern and Central Asian countries in the context of forming Eurasian infrastructural and civilizational highways

Research Networks and Partnerships 
The LIIA is a member of numerous research networks and has many prominent partners. These research networks include:

 The Transeuropean Policy Studies Association (TEPSA)
 The EU Non-Proliferation Consortium
 EU Consent
 Euro-Mediterranean Study Commission (EuroMesCo)
European Policy Institutes Network (EPIN)
IRSEC Hub

The Latvian Institute of International Affairs works in conjunction with the European partners mentioned below:

 Friedrich-Ebert-Stiftung Latvia
 Soros Foundation – Latvia
 Latvian Transatlantic Organization
 The Ministry of Defence of the Republic of Latvia
 Konrad Adenauer Foundation
 Centre For East European Policy Studies
 Nordic Council of Ministers
 Embassy of Norway in Latvia
 Swedish Defence Research Agency (FOI)

These collaborative endeavours include research, seminars, conferences, lectures, and publications.

References

External links 
 

Think tanks established in 1992
Think tanks based in Latvia
1992 establishments in Latvia